Novy is a rural locality (a selo) and the administrative center, and one of two inhabited localities including Saydy of Ynginsky Rural Okrug in Tomponsky District of the Sakha Republic, Russia, located  from Khandyga, the administrative center of the district. Its population as of the 2002 Census was 294.

References

Notes

Sources
Official website of the Sakha Republic. Registry of the Administrative-Territorial Divisions of the Sakha Republic. Tomponsky District. 

Rural localities in Tomponsky District